Gao Heng (July 29, 1900 – February 2, 1986) was a Chinese philologist and palaeographer, known for his work on the modern interpretation of the I Ching.  Among his most important accomplishments, he published a new translation of the ancient political treatise of Lord Shang with an original commentary in the (tumultuous) context of the 1970s.

Gao Heng was born in Shuangyang County, Jilin Province. In 1953, Gao joined the faculty of Shandong University as a professor. From 1957 onwards, he was also a part-time fellow of the Institute of Philosophy in the Chinese Academy of Sciences. In 1967, he transferred to Beijing and specialized in ancient and classical literature research.

References

1900 births
1986 deaths
I Ching
Philosophers from Jilin
Writers from Changchun
Academic staff of Shandong University
Chinese Academy of Social Sciences
Chinese philologists
Chinese palaeographers
Educators from Jilin
20th-century philologists
National University of Peking alumni